Todd Viney (born 30 March 1966) is an Australian rules football executive and former player and coach. He is currently the General Manager of Football of the North Melbourne Football Club.

Early life
As a youngster, Viney was a talented tennis player and held an Australian Institute of Sport scholarship holder from 1983 to 1984. At 18, however, he decided to switch and pursue a footballing career.

Playing career

Melbourne Football Club
A Sturt recruit, Viney was mostly a wingman and on-baller for Melbourne Football Club.

After nine seasons with the Demons, he decided to retire from football in order to become the fitness coach and hitting partner of the young tennis star Mark Philippoussis. However, Todd's standing with Mark's father/manager/coach Nick Philippoussis was very strained (as many people had warned him), and he soon resumed his football career with the Demons, midway through the 1996 season.

Viney captained the Demons in 1998 and 1999. In 1998, Viney earned All-Australian selection finished equal fifth in the 1998 Brownlow Medal. He also twice won the Keith 'Bluey' Truscott Trophy as Melbourne's best and fairest.

Viney announced his retirement before the end of the 1999 season due to nerve and hamstring related injuries. He is named in Melbourne’s Team of the Century, and is a member of the Club’s Hall of Fame.

Viney's brother Jay also played with Melbourne from 1988 to 1991.

Coaching career

Melbourne Football Club
In 2000, he joined the Melbourne Football Club coaching panel as an assistant coach in the role of  midfield coach under senior coach Neale Daniher. Viney was also part of the coaching panel in the club's 2000 Grand Final Loss. Viney didn't continue in the role for the 2001 season.

Moama Football Club
Viney then moved to Echuca coaching country club Moama in 2003 and 2004.

Hawthorn Football Club
Former teammate and Hawthorn Football Club senior coach Alastair Clarkson recruited Viney as an assistant coach at Hawthorn from 2005 to the end of 2008, including their 2008 premiership victory.

Adelaide Crows
Viney then moved to the Adelaide Crows as an assistant coach from 2009 to 2010. Viney resigned from his role as the assistant coach of Adelaide Crows at the conclusion of the 2010 season.

Return to Melbourne Football Club
With Viney's move back to the Demons, Adelaide conceded Viney's talented son, Jack, to the Demons, under the father-son rule.

After Dean Bailey was sacked as senior coach in the middle of the 2011 season, the Melbourne Football Club announced that Viney would be caretaker senior coach for the remainder of the 2011 season. Melbourne under Viney, won one game and lost four games of the remaining five games left in the 2011 season, to finish in thirteenth place on the ladder. At the end of the 2011 season, Viney chose not to re-apply for the senior coaching job and was replaced by Mark Neeld as senior coach of Melbourne Football Club. Viney however remained with the club as the General Manager of Player Personnel.

Viney left the Melbourne Football Club at the end of the 2019 season.

North Melbourne Football Club

Statistics

Playing statistics

|-
! scope="row" style="text-align:center" | 1987
|style="text-align:center;"|
| 12 || 16 || 9 || 11 || 180 || 79 || 259 || 58 || 44 || 0.6 || 0.7 || 11.3 || 4.9 || 16.2 || 3.6 || 2.8 || 3
|-
! scope="row" style="text-align:center" | 1988
|style="text-align:center;"|
| 12 || 12 || 1 || 7 || 65 || 41 || 106 || 21 || 16 || 0.1 || 0.6 || 5.4 || 3.4 || 8.8 || 1.8 || 1.3 || 0
|-
! scope="row" style="text-align:center" | 1989
|style="text-align:center;"|
| 12 || 9 || 6 || 4 || 90 || 49 || 139 || 39 || 11 || 0.7 || 0.4 || 10.0 || 5.4 || 15.4 || 4.3 || 1.2 || 0
|-
! scope="row" style="text-align:center" | 1990
|style="text-align:center;"|
| 12 || 15 || 12 || 13 || 190 || 74 || 264 || 51 || 21 || 0.8 || 0.9 || 12.7 || 4.9 || 17.6 || 3.4 || 1.4 || 1
|-
! scope="row" style="text-align:center" | 1991
|style="text-align:center;"|
| 12 || 24 || 13 || 15 || 412 || 182 || 594 || 103 || 36 || 0.5 || 0.6 || 17.2 || 7.6 || 24.8 || 4.3 || 1.5 || 7
|-
! scope="row" style="text-align:center" | 1992
|style="text-align:center;"|
| 12 || 22 || 7 || 4 || 234 || 162 || 396 || 76 || 40 || 0.3 || 0.2 || 10.6 || 7.4 || 18.0 || 3.5 || 1.8 || 1
|-
! scope="row" style="text-align:center" | 1993
|style="text-align:center;"|
| 12 || 20 || 6 || 5 || 238 || 228 || 466 || 67 || 38 || 0.3 || 0.3 || 11.9 || 11.4 || 23.3 || 3.4 || 1.9 || 2
|-
! scope="row" style="text-align:center" | 1994
|style="text-align:center;"|
| 12 || 25 || 3 || 1 || 258 || 288 || 546 || 74 || 59 || 0.1 || 0.0 || 10.3 || 11.5 || 21.8 || 3.0 || 2.4 || 2
|-
! scope="row" style="text-align:center" | 1995
|style="text-align:center;"|
| 12 || 17 || 4 || 4 || 179 || 175 || 354 || 56 || 35 || 0.2 || 0.2 || 10.5 || 10.3 || 20.8 || 3.3 || 2.1 || 3
|-
! scope="row" style="text-align:center" | 1996
|style="text-align:center;"|
| 12 || 12 || 1 || 8 || 123 || 127 || 250 || 44 || 21 || 0.1 || 0.7 || 10.3 || 10.6 || 20.8 || 3.7 || 1.8 || 2
|-
! scope="row" style="text-align:center" | 1997
|style="text-align:center;"|
| 12 || 22 || 7 || 2 || 261 || 235 || 496 || 61 || 60 || 0.3 || 0.1 || 11.9 || 10.7 || 22.5 || 2.8 || 2.7 || 9
|-
! scope="row" style="text-align:center" | 1998
|style="text-align:center;"|
| 12 || 22 || 15 || 9 || 281 || 199 || 480 || 94 || 43 || 0.7 || 0.4 || 12.8 || 9.0 || 21.8 || 4.3 || 2.0 || 20
|-
! scope="row" style="text-align:center" | 1999
|style="text-align:center;"|
| 12 || 17 || 8 || 12 || 176 || 110 || 286 || 52 || 26 || 0.5 || 0.7 || 10.4 || 6.5 || 16.8 || 3.1 || 1.5 || 5
|- class="sortbottom"
! colspan=3| Career
! 233
! 92
! 95
! 2687
! 1949
! 4636
! 796
! 450
! 0.4
! 0.4
! 11.5
! 8.4
! 19.9
! 3.4
! 1.9
! 55
|}

Coaching statistics

|- style="background-color: #EAEAEA"
! scope="row" style="text-align:center; font-weight:normal" | 2011*
|style="text-align:center;"|
| 5 || 1 || 4 || 0 || 20.0% || 13 || 17
|- class="sortbottom"
! colspan=2| Career totals
! 5
! 1
! 4
! 0
! 20.0%
! colspan=2|
|}
* = Caretaker coach

Honours and achievements

Individual
Keith 'Bluey' Truscott Medal: 1993, 1998
Melbourne F.C. Captain: 1998-1999
All-Australian: 1998
Melbourne F.C. Team of the Century
AFL Rising Star Nominee: 1993 (Round 6)
Melbourne F.C. Coach: 2011 (Caretaker)

References

External links

 DemonWiki profile

1966 births
Living people
Australian rules footballers from South Australia
Melbourne Football Club players
South Australian State of Origin players
Keith 'Bluey' Truscott Trophy winners
Sturt Football Club players
All-Australians (AFL)
Melbourne Football Club captains
Melbourne Football Club coaches
Australian Institute of Sport tennis players
Australia international rules football team players
Australian male tennis players